George Richards (4 October 1807) was an English cricketer who was associated with Surrey and made his first-class debut in 1828.

References

1807 births
Year of death unknown
English cricketers
English cricketers of 1826 to 1863
Surrey cricketers
People from Godalming